The Alnwick branch line is a partly closed railway line in Northumberland, northern England.

It opened on 5 August 1850 to both freight and passenger traffic. Passenger operations included direct Newcastle to Alnwick services, as well as regular shuttle runs between Alnmouth and Alnwick. As late as 1966, some of the Alnmouth to Alnwick shuttles were still operated by steam locomotives.

Operation 
All Newcastle-Alnwick services and some local trains were taken over by diesel multiple unit trains from 21 April 1958, with schedules cut by up to 15 minutes.

Closure 
The passenger service was withdrawn in January 1968 and the line closed completely in October 1968, on cost grounds. The old railway embankment west of where the line crossed the A1 road now forms the rear boundary of some of the gardens on the Royal Oak Gardens residential development.

Preservation and revival 

The Aln Valley Railway is a heritage railway based on the Alnwick Branch Line. Reconstruction of the railway is an ongoing project, the intention being to reopen the old branch line from the newly completed  terminus station in Alnwick (not built on the site of the original station due to it being unavailable and there being new buildings on some of the trackbed into the town centre) to Alnmouth station. The railway project is managed by the Aln Valley Railway Trust (AVRT), a registered charity.

The project first emerged with the foundation of the Aln Valley Railway Society (since merged into the Aln Valley Railway Trust) in 1995 and plans were announced in 1997 to reopen almost the entire length of the original branch line. However this proposal would have required the construction of a costly bridge over the A1 dual carriageway bypass on the edge of Alnwick (and was later hindered further by the construction of a Lidl supermarket on the approach to the original station) and so plans were later revised and it was instead decided that a new station should be built on a site close to where the later A1 bypass truncated the original line.

Between April 2000 and November 2014 the Aln Valley Railway also had a presence at Longhoughton goods yard, where rolling stock and other items were temporarily stored and prepared for eventual movement to the Lionheart site, once it became available.

Planning permission was granted by Northumberland County Council on 1 July 2010 and the lease for the site signed on 22 February 2012. The site first opened to visitors five months later on 14 July, but only to demonstrate the ongoing work alongside exhibits of rolling stock as well as an indoor exhibition area, café, souvenir shop and model railway; the first train (an engineer's train) did not run until 3 November 2012. Passengers were first carried 28 March 2013 using the railway's Wickham trolley, a service which continued throughout the 2013 season. Later that year, on 10 September, the first trial steam service was operated (though not for public passengers) and the railway was formally opened by the Duke of Northumberland on 30 October 2013.

Following the virtual completion of the initial plans for Lionheart station, the railway began works to extend the line onto the original trackbed of the Alnwick Branch Line (which passed the site in a cutting and thus had to be partially raised so as to allow trains to gradually descend from the station) in October 2015. On 28 December 2017, a public passenger train from Lionheart station ran along a section of the original branch line for the first time since the line closed nearly 50 years previously. From August 2018, passenger trains regularly ran the short distance from Lionheart station to Alndyke Farm Crossing, just beyond Bridge 6.

In July 2018, the AVRT was awarded a Rural Development Programme for England grant (using funds jointly provided by the European Agricultural Fund for Rural Development and by the Department for Environment, Food and Rural Affairs) together with 20% match funding from Sustrans which constitute a total of £146,600. The grant has been used to cover the costs of groundworks and track materials to extend the running line over the Cawledge Viaduct to a point just before the line passes under Edenhill Bridge, and has also covered the costs of constructing a new station at this location, together with a run-round loop. A railway coachBG No. 31407is being used to provide facilities for the new station, which is almost complete (2021).

Though it remains the goal of the AVRT to reopen the rest of the line through to Alnmouth, for it to continue beyond Edenhill Bridge, it must obtain a Transport and Works Act Order. Further planning permission will also be required and a lease will have to be negotiated with Network Rail for the final section of the former line into Alnmouth station, which ran alongside to the East Coast Main Line.

Rolling stock

Steam locomotives 
 Hudswell Clarke  no. 9 Richboro, built in 1917. Operational.
 Hawthorn Leslie  no. 3799 Penicuik, built in 1935. Stored undercover at Lionheart. At present, the locomotive is privately owned and the AVR are not permitted to restore it.
 Hunslet Austerity 0-6-0ST no. 60 built in 1948. Works number 3686. Built for the National Coal Board with cab and bunker cut down to a smaller loading gauge for working the Lambton Drops, a coal staith in Sunderland. Operational and on long-term loan (private owner)
 Hunslet Austerity 0-6-0ST no. 48 built in 1943. Works number 2864. War Department 75015. Stored undercover at Lionheart.
 Hudswell Clarke  no. 20 Jennifer, built 1942. Works No 1731. Operational and on long-term loan (private owner)

Diesel locomotives 
 Drewry  no. 8199 Drax, built in 1963. Operational.
 Andrew Barclay  no. 615, built in 1977. Operational and on loan from Tanfield Railway (private owner). This was the final surface locomotive to work for the National Coal Board.
 British Rail Class 11  no. 12088 Shirley, built in 1951. Operational. Undergoing major overhaul (April 2017). Also requires minor body work before being repainted into BR black.
 Ruston and Hornsby  no. S518256, built in 1948. Pending major restoration.
 Ruston and Hornsby  no. L2, built in 1952. Requiring major works. Currently on display at the entrance of the Lionheart site.

Diesel Multiple Units 
 Class 144 144004, introduced in December 1986. Moved to the Aln Valley Railway 15 December 2020. Formerly in service with Northern Trains. Vehicles 55804 (DMS), 55827 (DMSL).
 Class 144 144016, introduced in March 1987. Moved to the Aln Valley Railway 16 and 17 December 2020. Formerly in service with Northern Trains. Vehicles 55816 (DMS), 55852 (MS), 55839 (DMSL).

Coordinates

References

Notes

Sources 
 
 
 
 
 
 
 
 
 
 
 BVE simulation of Alnmouth to Alnwick
 The line on navigable O.S. map

External links 
 Aln valley railway website

Alnwick
Closed railway lines in North East England
History of Northumberland
Railway lines opened in 1850
Heritage railways in Northumberland